The Booyong Flora Reserve is a protected nature reserve located in Booyong in the Northern Rivers region of New South Wales, Australia.

Description

The red-brown soil is derived from a basaltic flow from the nearby Mount Warning and later volcanic flows from the Nightcap Range.

90 species of rainforest trees have been recorded in this small area. Significant rainforest tree species include White Booyong, Small-leaved Fig, Olivers Sassafras, Black Bean, Grey Walnut, Blush Walnut, Koda, Red Cedar, White Beech, Pepperberry and Hard Quandong. Rainforest myrtles at Booyong reserve are well represented.

A sealed road divides the reserve, with a grassy area in the western corner, surrounded by rainforest. Another grassy area to the north by the railway line also abuts onto the rainforest.

A colony of Grey-headed Flying Fox lives in this reserve. The spectacular Richmond Birdwing butterfly may be seen here, as its food plant grows in this rainforest.

See also

 Andrew Johnston Big Scrub Nature Reserve
 Protected areas of New South Wales

References

External links

Flora reserves in New South Wales
Forests of New South Wales
Northern Rivers